South Beach was a station on the demolished South Beach Branch of the Staten Island Railway. It had two tracks and two side platforms, and was located at Sand Lane and Oceanside Avenue.

This station was the last stop on the South Beach Branch until the opening of the Wentworth Avenue in 1925, when the South Beach Branch was electrified. The ticket agent at South Beach controlled the lights for Wentworth Avenue. This station was abandoned when the SIRT discontinued passenger service on the entire South Beach Branch at midnight on March 31, 1953, because of city-operated bus competition.

References

External links
http://www.gretschviking.net/GOSIRTPage1.htm

South Beach Branch stations
1890 establishments in New York (state)
Railway stations in the United States opened in 1890
Railway stations closed in 1953
1953 disestablishments in New York (state)